Kerry Baptiste (born 1 December 1981) is a Trinidadian football striker, who currently plays for the Tampa Bay Rowdies in the North American Soccer League.

Club career
First signed with Joe Public in March 2007 on a two-year deal. In December 2009, he was offered a trial at Ipswich Town F.C. in the Football League Championship of England. In May 2010, he joined Major League Soccer club Toronto FC on trial. In January 2011, Baptiste rejected a contract offer from Joe Public after he was looking to take on a new challenge. He was on trial with Seattle Sounders FC of MLS but was not signed.

Baptiste eventually signed in July 2011 with FC Tampa Bay of the North American Soccer League.

International career
Baptiste has graduated from the National Under 20 team which he played for at the 2001 CONCACAF qualifiers in T&T and was also a member of the Under 23 team.

International goals

References

External links 

1981 births
Living people
Trinidad and Tobago footballers
Trinidad and Tobago international footballers
San Juan Jabloteh F.C. players
Joe Public F.C. players
Tampa Bay Rowdies players
2007 CONCACAF Gold Cup players
Expatriate soccer players in the United States
North American Soccer League players
TT Pro League players
Association football forwards